CDC Geelong, formerly known as Benders Busways, is a bus company operating in Geelong, Victoria, Australia, operating routes as well as charters. It is a subsidiary of CDC Victoria, in turn a subsidiary of ComfortDelGro Australia, in turn a subsidiary of Singapore-based ComfortDelGro.

History

Benders Busways was formed by Ernest and Aimee Bender in 1926, and was established for 75 years. Their son Norman Bender eventually took over the business.

The first route ran from Geelong to Chilwell, and in 1931 a second route commenced from the Geelong Post Office to the corner of Minerva Road and Aberdeen Street in Geelong West.

The closure of the Geelong tram system in 1956 saw Benders win the contract to serve the former tram routes with buses. Eighteen new buses were purchased to run the increased number of services.
 
In 1987, Benders purchased IJ Cook & Son. In June 2000 the Bender family sold Benders Busways to the Kefford Corporation. In February 2009 the Kefford Corporation was sold to ComfortDelGro Cabcharge (CDC), with the sale including Benders Busways for A$149 million. At the time Kefford was the fourth-largest bus operator in Victoria, with a fleet of 328 buses and six depots, and with a market share of 16%. On 14 July 2014, CDC announced that Benders Busways would be re-branded as CDC Geelong.

On 1 July 2022, CDC Geelong's Regional Bus Services Contract to operate bus services was renewed for 10 years. It would also be subject to new performance measures and service standards, consistent with the bus services in Melbourne.

Livery

When the Geelong Transit System (GTS)  was first introduced in 1983, buses operated by Benders on route services were painted in the blue stripe and white GTS livery. However the contract with the state government requiring Benders to use the GTS livery on its urban route buses expired in 2000, and under the subsequent contract the company's buses all reverted to Benders' former white and green livery.

In August 2014, CDC Victoria announced that it had started to use the recently-introduced Public Transport Victoria orange and white livery on its buses, replacing the former Benders livery, and CDC Geelong buses providing public transport services were progressively repainted. An orange, blue and white livery was adopted for charter buses.

Fleet
As at June 2022, the CDC Geelong fleet consisted of 85 buses and coaches.

See also
McHarry's Buslines

References

External links

Company website

Bus companies of Victoria (Australia)
ComfortDelGro companies
Transport in Geelong